Licnodamaeidae is a family of mites; nymphs retain their moulted exuviae until adulthood.

References

Acari families